Florian Kenneth Lawton (lǎw-tŏn; June 21, 1921 – January 11, 2011) was an American visual artist and a realist painter who worked primarily in a regional style.

Lawton's subjects encompass rural landscapes including lakes, as well as hunting and fishing narratives reflecting his personal interests. Along with his interest in nature, his works reflect his friendships within the Amish community. He created many narrative paintings and drawings that capture the Amish at work and play in Ohio, Pennsylvania and Indiana.

History

Childhood and youth
Lawton was the seventh of nine children (born Florian K. Lawicki) raised in Garfield Heights, Ohio.
His parents were Maximillian and Mary Kotlarek Lawicki. Max owned a butcher shop and was a hard working and caring father. Lawton's talent for drawing was recognized at an early age. Walks in the metropolitan parks at a young age fostered his fondness, and deep appreciation of nature and the changing seasons, so dramatic in the Great Lakes region of the United States.

In junior and senior high school he designed sets for plays and other performances under the guidance of Francis Schwartz, his first art teacher. He graduated from Garfield Heights High School. Attending Cleveland College for two years, he took life drawing, illustration and painting classes. Moving on to further his art education, he attended John Huntington Polytechnic School, where he developed his drawing and illustration skills. He was  most inspired by the illustrations he had seen in Scribner's Magazine and The Saturday Evening Post by Norman Rockwell and Frederic Remington.

In 1943, during World War II, Lawton and his four brothers enlisted in the Army. He was assigned to the 7th Army Air Corp Intelligence Unit. There he created Topographic maps, and gathered strategic information from pilots returning from their missions. On the side, he painted various symbols on airplanes and tanks.

He returned to Cleveland in 1946 and enrolled in the Cleveland School of Art, (now called the Cleveland Institute of Art). Mentored principally by Jack Burton, noted industrial designer, along with Paul Travis, Frank Wilcox and Rolf Stoll, his earliest, notable illustration is a 1946 advertisement for Frigidaire of one of their new model refrigerators. Frank Wilcox as a teacher, systematically taught Lawton every aspect of making a watercolor painting. Because of Wilcox, and other well known artists in Cleveland during the 1940s, "they offered some of the most systematic training in watercolor technique available in the United States".

Marriage and children
From 1946 to 1948 Florian supported himself as a working artist doing illustrations for children's books as well as portraits. In 1948 he married Lois Mary Ondrey and they subsequently had four children. The first, in 1949, was Kenneth, followed by David, Dawn and Patricia. None have followed in their father's footsteps as an artist. He worked as a purchasing agent while he and his wife raised their children all the while painting on the side. His first major recognition came with an award bestowed by the Cleveland Museum of Art and its director, William Milliken for a watercolor, in 1949. This recognition provided the impetus to change his name from Lawicki to Lawton, to fit more comfortably into a culture that prized Anglo-Saxon traditions after the second world war. Living in Shaker Heights and the Chagrin Valley of northeast Ohio, his family and recognition as a regional artist grew.

Work

Supporting a growing family by work for corporate America, Lawton followed his artistic development with exhibitions at the Chautauqua Institute in New York State. He had a regional gallery relationship with the Bonfoey Gallery in Cleveland, Ohio, which handled his work successfully for many decades. The late 1960s and 1970s brought more honors and recognition through national exhibitions, for which he received many awards. An instructor at the Cleveland Institute of Art in the 1970s, he was invited to become a member of the Salmagundi Club in New York City. In 1970 he was featured on the Watercolor Page of the American Watercolor magazine. The same year a one artist show at the Bonfoey Gallery sold out. Lawton was a realist painter in the tradition of Winslow Homer and Thomas Eakins. His favorite subjects were nature and the people around him. With a passion for the outdoors, sporting subjects were a favorite. Hunting and fishing scenes, produced commissions from patrons throughout the United States. Living in the Great Lakes region, in the 1960s, he became friends with a wide range of Amish families in Ohio, Pennsylvania and Indiana that resulted in a deep respect for their culture and the simplicity in their lives. A large body of narrative paintings and drawings were created of the Amish, from 1969 until the end of his career. His son, Kenneth Lawton, describes his father's interest in the Amish:He found the Amish culture to be a perfect fit in terms of his personality. The simplicity of their culture, their reverence for nature. They don’t change things — they work within the balance of nature. That appealed to [my father] very much. By 1974 he was able to stop working and paint full time.

In 1989 the Butler Institute of American Art recognized Lawton's accomplishments with a 25 Year Retrospective and again in 2010 with a 50 Year Retrospective, curated by Dr. Henry Adams, former Curator of American Art at the Cleveland Museum of Art, and professor of American Art History at Case Western Reserve University. Further national recognition was achieved when a New York art collector and supporter of President Clinton in 2000, had a painting accepted for donation by the White  House.
Finding inspiration from the land and his deep personal respect for the Amish culture served Lawton throughout his career in all his creative pursuits. Living in the Great Lakes region throughout his life, provided a fascination with the translucence of snow in his paintings. A master of technique, Lawton was able to achieve a transcendental quality in his winter paintings, with his mastery of his use of the 'white on white technique' where the paper is virtually a "pigment" to create an emotional effect on the viewer.

Critical reaction
Clyde J. Singer, assistant director at the Butler Institute of American Art, had this to say about the artist's work: "Lawton looks at the world at large with a glint in his eye and what he sees must look mighty good to him. His subjects are usually the basis for artistic commentary on the AMERICAN SCENE a term once mentioned to Edward Hopper in a questionable way when he visited Youngstown in the 1950s his reply 'What's Wrong With That?' In these times of so much crudity and meaningless minimalism prominent in contemporary art, Lawton stands tall as a technically accomplished artist - and to repeat Hopper's words: 'What's Wrong With That."

Professor Henry Adams of Case Western Reserve University curated Lawton's second retrospective show at Youngstown's Butler Institute of American Art in 2010. Of Lawton's work he wrote: "Florian Lawton had a gentle touch, and excelled in the rendering of subtle winter scenes. He also had special affinity for the Amish, whose customs appealed to his sense of enduring values, and his drawings and watercolors of Amish subjects are remarkable not only in visual terms but for their value as a cultural and historical record."

Death
An engaging personality as an instructor, he taught watercolor classes in Ohio until the week before his death of natural causes, at age 89, on January 11, 2011.

Museum and major public collections
Cleveland Museum of Art; Butler Institute of American Art; The White House, Washington DC; New York State Canal Museum, Syracuse NY; Cuyahoga Valley National Park Museum,  Peninsula OH;  American Museum of Fly Fishing, Manchester VT; Cleveland Clinic Foundation, Cleveland Ohio; Bank of America, Charlotte NC; Price Waterhouse Cooper, NYC; Eaton Corporation, NYC; Senator George Voinovich, Columbus Ohio; Diamond Shamrock, Dallas TX; King Khalid, Saudi Arabia; Salve Regina University, Newport RI; Key Corporation, Cleveland, Ohio; Kaiser Permanente, Washington DC; Chautauqua Institute, Chautauqua NY

American Artist, "Watercolor Page" 1970; 'Amish Romance,' PBS Ohio Bicentennial Committee 1975; La Revue Moderne Des Arts Paris, France 1978;,  Artists Magazine cover and editorial 1996; Amish Pioneers Reda Productions for Arts & Entertainment Network 1998;  American Art Review December 2009;  Florian K. Lawton Fifty Years of Art  2010 Publication for the Butler Museum of American Art, Dr. Henry Adams Curator; American Fly Fisher Journal of the American Fly Fishing Museum, Summer 2012; Chagrin Valley Magazine, Artist Page, Summer 2012.

By invitation Lawton was honored with memberships with the following national and regional art organizations:  Salmagundi Club, NYC; American Watercolor Society, NYC;  National Watercolor Society, Los Angeles CA;  Audubon Artists, NYC;  Midwest Watercolor Society, Columbus, OH; Pennsylvania Watercolor Society, New Freedom PA; Kentucky Watercolor Society, Louisville KY;  Whiskey Painters of America, Akron Ohio; and The Artist Fellowship, NYC.

External links
 Official website

References

1921 births
2011 deaths
American male artists
American watercolorists
United States Army personnel of World War II